The 1993 CONCACAF Women's Invitational Tournament was the second edition of the CONCACAF Women's Championship, a tournament of the Confederation of North, Central American and Caribbean Association Football. The tournament took place in Long Island, New York, United States from August 4–8, 1993, and consisted of 4 teams, one of whom, New Zealand, was an invited guest.

Final round

Awards

External links
Tables & results at RSSSF.com
USWNT Results 1990-1994 at ussoccerhistory.org

Women's Championship
CONCACAF Women's Championship tournaments
History of the United States women's national soccer team
1993
CON
CONCACAF Women's Championship
August 1993 sports events in the United States
1993 in American women's soccer
Soccer in New York (state)
Women's sports in New York (state)